Raymond Gary Lake is a reservoir in southeastern Oklahoma, United States, one mile east of the town of Fort Towson in Choctaw County. It was constructed on Gates Creek in 1956 by the Oklahoma Department of Wildlife Conservation.

Its primary uses are for fishing and general recreation. The lake and the adjacent Raymond Gary State Park were named for Raymond Dancel Gary, who served as governor of Oklahoma from 1955 until 1959. The town limits of Fort Towson were extended in 1979, so that residents around the lake would be enumerated in Fort Towson.

Description of lake and dam
Lake elevation is approximately  The maximum capacity is 3,960 acre-ft and the normal storage is 1,681 acre-ft. It drains an area of 

Fishing is permitted. Species include bass, catfish and sunfish.

Raymond Gary State Park
Raymond Gary State Park is on the opposite side of Raymond Gary Lake from Fort Towson, and contains most of the public access to the lake. Recreational facilities include multiple fishing jetties, two boat ramps, a handicap-accessible fishing dock, restrooms and sanitary facilities. Hunting is prohibited in the park.

References

External links
Oklahoma Wildlife Department map of Lake Raymond Gary

Reservoirs in Oklahoma
Dams completed in 1956
Bodies of water of Choctaw County, Oklahoma